Myodochini is a tribe of dirt-colored seed bugs in the family Rhyparochromidae. There are more than 80 genera and 370 described species in Myodochini.

Genera
These 88 genera belong to the tribe Myodochini:

 Acrolophyses Dellapé & Henry, 2010
 Aegyptocoris China, 1936
 Afrovertanus Scudder, 1962
 Andercnemodus Brailovsky & Cervantes, 2011
 Ashlockaria Harrington, 1980
 Bacacephalus Harrington, 1980
 Baranowskiobius Dellapé, Melo & Henry, 2016
 Bergicoris Dellapé, 2010
 Caenopamera Barber, 1918
 Carpilis Stal, 1874
 Catenes Distant, 1893
 Cholula Distant, 1893
 Cnemodus Herrich-Schaeffer, 1850
 Distingphyses Scudder, 1962
 Dushinckanus Brailovsky, 1979
 Ereminellus Harrington, 1980
 Erlacda Signoret, 1863
 Eucosmetus Bergroth, 1894
 Euparomius Hedge, 1990
 Exopamera Distant, 1918
 Exopamerana Malipatil, 1978
 Fontathanus Scudder, 1963
 Froeschneria Harrington, 1980
 Gyndes Stal, 1862
 Henicopamerana Malipatil, 1986
 Henicorthaea Malipatil, 1978
 Henryaria Dellapé, Melo & Montemayor, 2018
 Heraeus Stal, 1862
 Horridipamera Malipatil, 1978
 Humilocoris Harrington, 1980
 Incrassoceps Scudder, 1978
 Kolenetrus Barber, 1918
 Ligyrocoris Stal, 1872
 Megacholula Harrington, 1980
 Megapamera Scudder, 1975
 Mimobius Poppius & Bergroth, 1921
 Myodacanthus Dellapé, 2012
 Myodocha Latreille, 1807 (long-necked seed bugs)
 Myodorthaea Malipatil, 1978
 Neocnemodus Dellapé & Malipatil, 2012
 Neomyocoris Dellapé & Montemayor, 2008
 Neopamera Harrington, 1980
 Orthaea Dallas, 1852
 Pachybrachius Hahn, 1826
 Paisana Dellapé, 2008
 Pamerana Distant, 1909
 Pamerapa Malipatil, 1978
 Pamerarma Malipatil, 1978
 Paracholula Harrington, 1980
 Paraheraeus Dellapé, Melo & Henry, 2016
 Parapamerana Malipatil, 1980
 Paraparomius Harrington, 1980
 Paromius Fieber, 1861
 Pephysena Distant, 1893
 Perigenes Distant, 1893
 Prytanes Distant, 1893
 Pseudocnemodus Barber, 1911
 Pseudolaryngodus Malipatil & Gao, 2019
 Pseudopachybrachius Malipatil, 1978
 Pseudopamera Distant, 1893
 Pseudoparomius Harrington, 1980
 Ptochiomera Say, 1831
 Remaudiereana Hoberlandt, 1954
 Scintillocoris Slater & Brailovsky, 1993
 Shinckadunus Dellapé & Melo, 2020
 Sisamnes Distant, 1893
 Slaterobius Harrington, 1980
 Stalaria Harrington, 1980
 Stigmatonotum Lindberg, 1927
 Stridulocoris Harrington, 1980
 Suffenus Distant, 1904
 Tenuicoris Slater & Harrington, 1974
 Thoraea Dellapé & Montemayor, 2011
 Togo Bergroth, 1906
 Valonetus Barber, 1918
 Villalobosothignus Brailovsky, 1984
 Woodwardocoris Malipatil, 1978
 Xenydrium Poppius & Bergroth, 1921
 Zeridoneus Barber, 1918
 Zeropamera Barber, 1948
 † Catopamera Scudder, 1890
 † Cophocoris Scudder, 1890
 † Ctereacoris Scudder, 1890
 † Eucorites Scudder, 1890
 † Lithocoris Scudder, 1890
 † Phrudopamera Scudder, 1890
 † Procoris Scudder, 1890
 † Stenopamera Scudder, 1890

References

Further reading

External links

 

Lygaeoidea